John Locke (1632–1704) was an English philosopher.

John Locke or John Lock may also refer to:
John Locke (author) (born 1951), American e-book writer of crime fiction and Westerns
John Locke (Canadian politician) (1825–1873), Nova Scotia Senator, 1867–1873
John Locke (Massachusetts politician) (1764–1855), member of the U.S. House of Representatives, 1823–1829
John Locke (MP) (1805–1880), British member of parliament for Southwark, 1857–1880
John Locke (musician) (1943–2006), former member of the jazz-hard rock band Spirit
John Locke (naturalist) (1792–1856), American naturalist, professor, photographer, and publisher
John Locke (poet) (1847–1889), Irish poet, novelist and journalist
John A. Locke (born 1962), member of the Massachusetts House of Representatives from 1995 to 2003
John Howard Locke (1923–1998), British civil servant
John L. Locke, American biolinguist, psycholinguist, child phonologist
John Locke (Lost), fictional character on the American television show Lost
John Bascombe Lock (1849–1921), bursar of Gonville and Caius College, Cambridge

See also 
 Lock (surname)
 Locke (jonh)